Nakheel Tower or Al Nakheel Tower (Arabic: برج النخيل) is a multi-use skyscraper located at Riyadh, Saudi Arabia. It is Riyadh's fifth tallest building, with a height of 200m. It has 26 floors above the ground and four floors below the ground. The construction started in 2008 and ended in 2011.

See also
List of tallest buildings in Saudi Arabia

References

2011 establishments in Saudi Arabia
Residential buildings completed in 2011
Skyscrapers in Riyadh
Residential skyscrapers in Saudi Arabia